Jalan Kuala Slim (Perak and Selangor state route A134 or B134) is a major road in Perak and Selangor state, Malaysia.

List of junctions

Kuala Slim